Rockdale County is a county located in the U.S. state of Georgia.  As of the 2020 census, the population was 93,570 up from 85,215 in 2010. The county seat is Conyers.

Rockdale County is included in the Atlanta-Sandy Springs-Roswell, GA Metropolitan Statistical Area.

History

Rockdale County was created on October 18, 1870 and received its name from Rockdale Baptist Church (est. 1846), which was named after the granite strata that rests under the county's red clay top soil.  A bill introduced by John F. Hardin and John Harris carved Rockdale out of the northern portion of Newton County; parts of Rockdale County also came from neighboring Henry, Walton, Gwinnett, and DeKalb counties.  Conyers, Rockdale's only incorporated town and urban center, became the county seat.

Prior to Rockdale becoming a county, the land had been inhabited by the Creek and Cherokee; the boundary between the two native nations, the Hightower Trail, ran directly through the area.  Burial remains have been discovered in the Honey Creek and Hi-Roc areas.  Whites began migrating to the area in the early 19th century and initial white settlers suffered from Indian raids.  Early white settlements developed along Big Haynes Creek in the northern part of the county, the Yellow River in the middle portion of the county, and Honey Creek in the south.  

Communities formed around grist mills and newly formed churches such as Haralson Mill, Costleys Mill, Dial Mill, Zacharys Mill, McElroys Mill, Union Grove Baptist Church, Ebenezer Methodist Church, Philadelphia Methodist Church, Salem Baptist Church, Smyrna Presbyterian Church, Pleasant Hill Baptist Church, Bethel Christian Church, Honey Creek Baptist Church, and Whites Chapel Methodist Church. Other communities included Magnet and Zingara.  These settlers were largely subsistence farmers.

During the American Civil War, General William Tecumseh Sherman marched the Union Army north of Conyers on his way to Covington from Lithonia.  Seizure and destruction of property accompanied his army's march through the area.  Many of the residents of Conyers, fearing Sherman would raze the city, fled to nearby Social Circle in Walton County, since Conyers was an important stop on the Georgia Railroad, but Conyers remained unscathed by the war. 

The city is a fine example of residential and commercial architecture of the 19th century.  According to a historical marker on U.S. Highway 278 west of Conyers, Major General Joseph Wheeler of the Confederate States Army and part of his staff were captured by Union troops pursuing Jefferson Davis on May 9, 1865.  Wheeler was later released in Athens only to be recaptured again.  He was wounded three times and had his horse shot out from under him sixteen times.

During Reconstruction, Conyers and Rockdale County experienced tremendous growth.  According to the local newspaper, The Weekly Farmer, the population of Conyers increased from 300 to 2,000.  The number of stores, businesses, schools, and churches of the county rapidly multiplied as well.  Parts of the county were infamous for moonshining and the county became dry in 1882, prohibiting the sale and manufacture of liquor except by a licensed pharmacist as prescribed by a physician.  The economy of the county was still based primarily on agriculture into the early 20th century. The PBS documentary The Lost Children of Rockdale County is about a syphilis outbreak which occurred in the county during the 1990s.

Geography
It is the second-smallest county in Georgia by area, ahead of Clarke County.

The entirety of Rockdale County is located in the Upper Ocmulgee River sub-basin of the Altamaha River basin.

Adjacent counties
 Gwinnett County – north
 Walton County – northeast
 Newton County –  Southeast
 Henry County – southwest
 DeKalb County – west

Transportation

Major highways

  Interstate 20
  U.S. Route 278
  State Route 12
  State Route 20
  State Route 138
  State Route 162
  State Route 212
  State Route 402 (unsigned designation for I-20)

The county features an interchange of I-20 and SR 20. In order to ease potential motorist confusion, the concurrency of SR 20 & 138 is usually called just "138".

Pedestrians and cycling

 Arabia Mountain Path
 Conyers Trail
 Deer Run Trial
 Rockdale River Trail
 S River Trail

Demographics

2020 census

As of the 2020 United States census, there were 93,570 people, 32,792 households, and 23,533 families residing in the county.

2010 census
According to the 2010 U.S Census, the racial makeup of the county was 40.9% White, 45.8% Black, 0.2% American Indian, 1.8% Asian, 0.1% Native Hawaiian or Pacific Islander, 0.3% Other race, and 1.6% from two or more races.  9.5% of the population was Hispanic or Latino.

There were 24,052 households, out of which 39.10% had children under the age of 18 living with them, 61.60% were married couples living together, 12.40% had a female householder with no husband present, and 21.50% were non-families. 16.90% of all households were made up of individuals, and 5.30% had someone living alone who was 65 years of age or older.  The average household size was 2.87 and the average family size was 3.20.

In the county, the population was spread out, with 27.50% under the age of 18, 8.80% from 18 to 24, 30.50% from 25 to 44, 24.00% from 45 to 64, and 9.20% who were 65 years of age or older.  The median age was 35 years. For every 100 females, there were 98.80 males.  For every 100 females age 18 and over, there were 96.40 males.

The median income for a household in the county was $53,599, and the median income for a family was $60,065. Males had a median income of $41,087 versus $29,189 for females. The per capita income for the county was $22,300.  About 5.70% of families and 8.20% of the population were below the poverty line, including 10.00% of those under age 18 and 7.70% of those age 65 or over.

Education

Government and policing

Rockdale County Sheriff
The Sheriff's Office provides police patrol to the county areas other than in Conyers which has a municipal police department. The Sheriff also protects the court, maintains the county prison, and provides administration services.

Politics
The county has undergone a massive shift towards the Democratic Party in recent decades (due to increase of the African-American population), having shifted 36.2 points since 2000 as of 2020.

Notable people
 Jill Arrington, ESPN college football reporter
 Billy Buckner, former Major League Baseball player
 Cartel's Will Pugh, Joseph Pepper, Jeff Lett, Nic Hudson, & Kevin Sanders
 David Elder, former Major League Baseball player
 Dakota Fanning, actress
 Elle Fanning, actress
 Holly Hunter, actress
 John Mark Karr, JonBenét Ramsey's falsely claimed murderer
 Clint Mathis, World Cup soccer player
 Jack McBrayer, actor
 Kevin Ware, current college basketball player
 E.R. Shipp - Pulitzer Prize recipient
 Grady Jarrett - NFL player

Attractions
 Georgia International Horse Park 
 Black Shoals Lake and Covered Bridge
 Old Towne Conyers Historic District
 Monastery of the Holy Spirit 
 Salem Campground 
 Smyrna Campground
 Milstead Historic Mill Village
 Panola Mountain State Park
 Rockdale Baptist Church
 Georgia Revolution FC

Communities
 Conyers
 Lakeview Estates

See also

 National Register of Historic Places listings in Rockdale County, Georgia
List of counties in Georgia

Sources
 Margaret G. Barksdale, E. L. Cowan, Francis A. King, eds.  A History of Rockdale County (Conyers, Ga., 1978).
 The Heritage of Rockdale County, Georgia (Waynesville, N.C., 1998).

References

External links
 Rockdale County Historic Maps 
 Rockdale County Courthouse 
 The Rockdale Citizen 
 The Rockdale News  
 Conyers-Rockdale Chamber of Commerce 
 Conyers Convention and Visitor's Bureau 
 The Lost Children of Rockdale County 

 
Georgia (U.S. state) counties
Rockdale
1870 establishments in Georgia (U.S. state)
Populated places established in 1870
Black Belt (U.S. region)
Majority-minority counties in Georgia